The Peach Tree War, also known as the Peach War, was a large-scale attack on September 15, 1655 by the Susquehannock Indians and allied tribes on several New Netherland settlements along the North River (Hudson River).

The attack was motivated by the Dutch reconquest of New Sweden, a close trading partner and protectorate of the Susquehannocks. It was a decisive victory for the Indians, and many outlying Dutch settlements were forced to temporarily garrison in Fort Amsterdam. Some of these settlements were completely abandoned, such as the Staten Island colony, while others were soon repopulated and equipped with better defenses. Director-General Peter Stuyvesant repurchased the rights from the Indians to settle the west bank of the Hudson.

Background
In March 1638, Swedish colonists led by Peter Minuit landed in Wilmington, Delaware and established New Sweden on the west bank of the Delaware River. The area had previously been claimed by both the English and the Dutch, but neither had managed more than marginal occupation. Minuit had been a director of the Dutch West India Company's New Netherland colony, and he was familiar with the terrain and local custom. He purchased the right to settle the land from the Susquehannocks.

The Indians were distrustful of the Dutch because of their close alliance with the Iroquois Confederation, who were enemies of the Susquehannocks. They had lost their English trading partner when the new colony of Maryland had forced out William Claiborne's trading network centered on Kent Island. The Susquehannocks quickly became New Sweden's main supplier of furs and pelts and customers for European manufactured goods. In the process, New Sweden became a protectorate and tributary of the Susquehannock tribe.

The English and Dutch both rejected Sweden's right to its colony, but the Dutch had greater reason for concern since they had already claimed the Delaware River, which begins above the 42nd parallel north.

Johan Risingh was commissary and councilor to New Sweden's governor Johan Printz, and he attempted to expel the Dutch from the Delaware Valley in 1654. Fort Casimir was assaulted, surrendered, and renamed Fort Trefaldighet (Fort Trinity), leaving Swedes in complete possession of their colony. On June 21, 1654, the Indians met with the Swedes to reaffirm their agreements. A squadron of ships under the direction of Peter Stuyvesant seized New Sweden between September 11–15, 1655.

The attack
The Susquehannocks had gained dominance over the Lenape Indians, and this allowed them to assemble an army of warriors from multiple allied and neighboring groups. Six hundred warriors landed in New Amsterdam (Lower Manhattan), wreaking havoc through the narrow streets of the town which was mostly undefended, as the bulk of the garrison was in New Sweden. They then crossed the North River (Hudson River) and attacked Pavonia (today's Hoboken and Jersey City).

They took 150 hostages and held them at Paulus Hook (Jersey City). They also attacked farms at Harlem, Staten Island, and the Bronx. Stuyvesant had led the assault on New Sweden, but he hurried back to his capital on news of the attack. The ransomed settlers took temporary refuge in New Amsterdam, and the settlements on the west shore of the river were depopulated.

On Staten Island, 23 Dutch Settlers were killed and 67 were captured by the Hackensack tribe. Captain Adriaen Crijnin Post, who led the settlement of the Colony for Baron Hendrick van der Capellan, had learned the language of the Natives. Chief Penneckeck trusted him and permitted him to leave captivity to negotiate with Stuyvesant for the release of the settlers on behalf of the Natives.  The captives were safely returned, including his own wife and children, for the price of ammunitions, wampum and blankets.

The Baron ordered the 67 settlers to return and build a fort. They found their homes burned to the ground, crops destroyed or damaged, and their livestock and horses set free to roam or killed. Many of the inhabitants soon moved to the Long Island Colony. Post remained with a few settlers to fulfill the Baron's wishes, but his health declined temporarily and he was not able to complete his goal.  He eventually moved his family to what became Bergen County, New Jersey after the British gained control.

Impact and aftermath
The Swedes of the Zuydt Rivier (Delaware Valley) were aware that the Susquehannock's attack was in retaliation for the Dutch conquest of New Sweden, but the New Netherland colonists believed that it was because of the murder of a young Wappinger woman named Tachiniki whom a Dutch settler had allegedly killed for stealing a peach from the property of Cornelis van Tienhoven, an incident which had raised tensions shortly before the assault and which provided the name for the war.

Stuyvesant repurchased from the Indians the right to settle the area between the Hudson and Hackensack rivers. He established the fortified hamlet of Bergen and required blockhouses to be established there and at other outlying towns. The colony of Cornelis Melyn was abandoned on Staten Island.

See also
Esopus Wars
Kieft's War
Pequot War

References
Notes

Further reading

New Netherland
Second Northern War
Colonial American and Indian wars
Conflicts in 1655
Pre-statehood history of New Jersey
Battles involving Native Americans
Wars involving the Netherlands
Wappinger
Battles in New Jersey
Battles in New York (state)
Native American history of New Jersey
Native American history of New York (state)
Susquehannock
1655 in North America